Petar Relić may refer to:

Petar Relić (Yugoslav partisan)
Petar Relić (Serbian politician, 1939–2005)